Henry was a sailing ship built in 1819 at Quebec, Canada. She initially sailed between London and Quebec, but then she made two voyages transporting convicts from England to Australia. She was wrecked in the Torres Strait in 1825.

Career
Henry entered Lloyd's Register (LR), in 1820 with J. Turner, master, Osborne, owner, and trade London–Quebec. She was re-registered at London on 2 June 1820.

First convict voyage
Under the command of Thomas Thatcher and surgeon Thomas Davies, she left London, England on 10 June 1823, arrived at Sydney on 26 August. She had embarked 160 male convicts; no convicts died on the voyage. Henry sailed from Port Jackson on 27 September, bound for Batavia.

Second convict voyage
Henry left London, England under the command of James Ferrier and surgeon William Carlyle on 12 October 1824, arrived at Hobart Town on 9 February 1825. She had embarked 79 female convicts and passengers and landed 77 convicts at Hobart. No convicts died on the voyage. She left Hobart Town on 20 February, with 2 female convicts and passengers, arriving at Sydney on 27 February.

Fate
While on the voyage to Batavia, Henry was wrecked in the Torres Strait on 15 April with no loss of life. As she was proceeding in company with Asia via the Outer Route to Torres Strait, Henry struck Portlock Reef on the northern tip of the Great Barrier reef and was wrecked. Asia rescued all aboard Henry and eventually sailed on to Calcutta.

Citations and references
Citations

References
 
 
 

1819 ships
Ships built in Quebec
Age of Sail merchant ships of England
Convict ships to New South Wales
Convict ships to Tasmania
Maritime incidents in April 1825
Shipwrecks of the Torres Strait